The Second ministry of Manmohan Singh came into existence after the general election in 2009. The results of the election were announced on 16 May 2009 and led to the formation of the 15th Lok Sabha. Manmohan Singh took the oath as the 13th Prime Minister of India on 22 May 2009, followed by the oath-taking ceremonies of the Council of Ministers in two phases. They remained in office until next election

List of Council of Ministers

Cabinet Ministers 

!style="width:17em"| Remarks

Ministers of State (Independent Charge)

A 'Minister of State with independent charge' is a junior Minister in the Federal (State) or Central Government of India but is in charge of a ministry, unlike Minister of State who is also a junior Minister but assists a cabinet minister. All the following ministers are from the Indian National Congress.

Source: Council of Ministers

Ministers of State 

!style="width:17em"| Remarks

Demographics of the Ministers

Ministers by Party
Source: Various news organisations The new United Progressive Alliance (UPA) included 77 members, 76 members in the cabinet plus Prime Minister Manmohan Singh. The first 20 cabinet ministers including Manmohan Singh, swore in on 22 May 2009, while the other 59 cabinet members swore in on 27 May 2009. The non-Congress cabinet ministers, include Sharad Pawar and Praful Patel from Nationalist Congress Party, Farooq Abdullah from National Conference and Ajit Singh from RLD.

Ministers by States

Sources:

Entities in the Prime Minister's Office
 From October 2011, the post of Secretary under Prime Ministers office has been eliminated as per policy.

Approval Ratings
The approval ratings for the government from 2008 to 2013, according to Gallup polling, are given below.

References

Indian union ministries
2009 establishments in India
Manmohan Singh administration
Cabinets established in 2009
2014 disestablishments in India
Cabinets disestablished in 2014
Council of Ministers of India
Nationalist Congress Party
Trinamool Congress
Jammu & Kashmir National Conference
Indian National Congress
Indian Union Muslim League